Douglas Frederick Witcomb (18 April 1918 – 6 August 1999) was a former football player from Wales who played for the Welsh national team and for West Bromwich Albion, Sheffield Wednesday and Newport County in the English Football League.

Club career

A wing-half, Witcomb started playing at Enfield before beginning his Football League career with West Bromwich Albion in 1937. In a war-interrupted time with the club, he made 55 appearances and scored 3 goals.

During the war he was a guest-player for Lovell's Athletic, the works team for Lovell's sweet factory in Newport, Monmouthshire, Wales.

In March 1947, he joined Sheffield Wednesday and made 224 Football League appearances for the club, scoring 12 goals. He also made six FA Cup appearances for the side.

He joined Newport County for the 1953–54 season in November 1953, making 25 appearances before joining Llandudno.

He made one wartime appearance for Leicester City in 1941, playing against Tottenham Hotspur.  He failed to score in a 3–0 defeat.

International career

Witcomb attained three caps for the Welsh national team, playing in all three of his country's matches in the 1946–47 British Home Championship, making his debut on 19 October 1946 in a 3–1 victory over Scotland.  Wales lost the remaining two matches, 3–0 to England and 2–1 to Ireland.  He did not score any goals.

He played seven wartime matches for Wales, scoring one goal.

References

1918 births
Sportspeople from Ebbw Vale
1999 deaths
Newport County A.F.C. players
Sheffield Wednesday F.C. players
English Football League players
Wales international footballers
Welsh footballers
West Bromwich Albion F.C. players
Association football defenders
Lovell's Athletic F.C. wartime guest players